The People's Party or Socialist People's Party was a minor political party in the Furness region of England.

The party was founded in 1995 by four Labour Party borough councillors who had been suspended from Labour for opposing a reduction in the housing budget. It was initially known as the People's Labour Party, and stood their chair, Jim Hamezeian, in the Barrow and Furness constituency in the 1997 general election. He received 1,995 votes, 4.1% of the total in the constituency.

The party campaigned on a variety of local issues. A split led to two of its four councillors leaving and standing as independents in the 2003 local elections; the two People's Party councillors then lost their seats. However, in the 2006 local elections, party leader Jim Hamezian regained his seat in the Ormsgill ward.

In the 2008 local elections, one councillor was elected in Central Ward and three others elected in Ormsgill. Following this, in elections to Cumbria County Council in 2009, Jim Hamezeian was elected to serve for Ormsgill ward in Barrow-in-Furness.

After that, the party's support dropped: in the 2010 local elections the SPP lost two councillors, and lost all representation on the Borough council in 2011 local elections. The SPP retained one councillor on Cumbria County Council until the May 2013 elections, when they lost all representation. The party deregistered with the Electoral Commission in 2015 and its website is no longer active.

References

External links
Socialist People's Party

Labour Party (UK) breakaway groups
Political parties established in 1995
Political parties disestablished in 2015
Socialist parties in England
Furness
Defunct socialist parties in the United Kingdom
Politics of Cumbria
1995 establishments in England
2015 disestablishments in England